Arif Salimov (A.A. Salimov, born 1956) is an Azerbaijani/Soviet mathematician, Honored Scientist of Azerbaijan, known for his research in differential geometry. He obtained a B.Sc. degree from Baku State University, Azerbaijan in 1978, a PhD and Doctor of Sciences (Habilitation) degrees in geometry from Kazan State University, Russia in 1984 and 1998, respectively. His advisor was Vladimir Vishnevskii.  Salimov is currently full professor in the Faculty of Mechanics and Mathematics at the Baku State University and head of the department Algebra and Geometry at this University. He is an author and co-author of more than 100 articles. His primary areas of research are:
 theory of lifts in tensor bundles
 geometrical applications of tensor operators
 special Riemannian manifolds, indefinite metrics
 general geometric structures on manifolds (almost complex, almost product, hypercomplex, Norden structures etc.)

References

External links 
 http://www.atauni.edu.tr/#personel=arif-salimov
 http://mechmath.bsu.edu.az/en/content/algebra_and_geometry_514 Dep. of Algebra and Geometry
 https://president.az/articles/34950

Living people
1956 births
20th-century Azerbaijani mathematicians
Soviet mathematicians
Differential geometers
21st-century Azerbaijani mathematicians
Academic staff of Atatürk University
Baku State University alumni
Academic staff of Baku State University